Edward Fellowes may refer to:
 Edward Fellowes, 1st Baron de Ramsey, British Member of Parliament
 Sir Edward Fellowes (parliamentary official), Clerk of the House of Commons
 Edward Fellowes (cricketer), English cricketer and clergyman